Young People's Socialist League (YPSL) may refer to:

 Young People's Socialist League (1907), the youth wing of the Socialist Party of America;
 Young People's Socialist League (Socialist Party USA), the youth wing of Socialist Party USA.